Ojaq Qeshlaq-e Khoruslu (also Romanized as Ojāq Qeshlāq-e Khorūslū; also known as Ojāq Qeshlāq) is a village in Anjirlu Rural District, in the Central District of Bileh Savar County, Ardabil Province, Iran. At the 2006 census, its population was 188, in 45 families.

References 

Towns and villages in Bileh Savar County